François-Paul Brueys d'Aigalliers, Comte de Brueys (12 February 1753 – 1 August 1798) was a French naval officer who fought in the American War of Independence and as a commander in the French Revolutionary Wars. He led the French fleet in the Mediterranean campaign of 1798 until his death at the Battle of the Nile, at the rank of Vice-Admiral.  He was also a Freemason in the La Bonne Foi lodge at Montauban.

Life

Pre-Revolution
Brueys was born to an aristocratic family in Rue Boucairie, Uzès, southern France in a house which now bears a plaque with his name. Joining the navy at 13, he was a volunteer on the ship-of-the-line Protecteur in 1766, he served in several campaigns in the Levant. Becoming a Garde de la marine in 1768, he fought in the Tunis expedition on the frigate Atalante and the Saint Domingue campaign on the ship-of-the-line Actionnaire, though he was forced to leave the latter due to sickness and return to France, where he served at shore establishments, mostly on France's Mediterranean coast.

He rose to enseigne de vaisseau in 1777 and lieutenant de vaisseau in April 1780, before serving on the ship-of-the-line Terrible then the Zélé in Guichen's squadron. He fought in three battles against Admiral Rodney in April and May 1780, then in the battle against Hood's fleet before Fort-de-France in April 1781. He was present at all the battles involving Grasse's squadron, including the Chesapeake (September 1781) and the capture of Saint Kitts in February 1782. He then moved to the frigate Vestale, by chance he was not present at the battle of Les Saintes. He was made a chevalier de Saint-Louis at the end of the war.

On the peace he was put in command of the aviso Chien de Chasse, with which he spent four years in the Antilles and off the American coast. In 1787 he moved to command another aviso, the Coureur, which cruised along the coasts of Latin America. He then returned to France to command the fluyt Barbeau before taking one year's leave (1788–89). In 1790 he commanded the corvette Poulette. He sailed her from Toulon to Algiers with  M. Vallière, France's consul general in Algeria. She also carried dispatches for the naval station and French consuls in the Levant.

Revolutionary Wars
He saw aristocratic family and friends killed during the Reign of Terror but managed to avoid such a fate himself. He did not emigrate and even found himself promoted to capitaine de vaisseau on 1 January 1792, before being put in command of the ship-of-the-line Le Lys at Toulon (renamed le Tricolore on the fall of the monarchy). He fought in the campaigns undertaken by Admiral Truguet's fleet - the bombardment of Oneglia, the Naples operation led by Latouche-Tréville, and finally the attack on Cagliari on Sardinia.

In the Toulon affair the town authorities arrested him. A decree of the National Convention in September 1793 stripped him of his rank as a noble. Truguet's ministry in 1795 restored his rank and he received promotion to contre-amiral the following year. He commanded French naval forces in the Adriatic from 1796 to 1798, flying his flag in the ship-of-the-line Guillaume Tell. He transported troops to the Ionian Islands and supported Bonaparte's campaign in Italy by blockading the coasts but keeping supply lines open to Bonaparte's troops.

Egypt
Bonaparte noted Brueys's conduct in Italy and made him commander-in-chief of the fleet that would transport his army for the Egyptian campaign, with the rank of vice-admiral and flying his flag on the Orient. The fleet set sail from Toulon on 19 May 1798.

He succeeded in evading British attempts to prevent the French fleet reaching Egypt, reaching Malta and then (on 1 July 1798) Alexandria without incident. As soon as the land troops were disembarked, he was reputedly ordered by Bonaparte to either anchor in the port of Alexandria or return quickly to France, Malta or Corfu. Citing concern that the Alexandria harbor was too shallow and difficult to enter for his large warships, and unwilling to leave Egypt until the situation of the French army was secured, he instead opted to anchor in Aboukir Bay to await the British.

Knowing the poor quality of his ships and crews, he preferred to guard a defensive position than take the offensive and refused to weigh anchor when Horatio Nelson attacked his fleet on the evening of 1 August 1798. In the ensuing Battle of the Nile, the Orient fought , causing her major damage but receiving little support, especially from the rearguard under Denis Decrès and Villeneuve. Already wounded twice during the day, and almost cut in half by a cannon shot, Brueys died at his command post around 9 PM. According to a British account, after a round shot had taken off both his legs, he had himself strapped to an armchair on deck so that he could continue to direct the fight. His ship exploded one hour later after a fire on board reached the gunpowder stores. The resulting blast was seen from miles away and may have killed as many as 800 of the ship's crew.

Brueys was criticised in France for remaining at anchor right up until the moment of the attack, but Bonaparte replied to such criticism by saying "If, in this disastrous event, he made mistakes, he expiated them by his glorious end". His name appears on the southern pillar (23rd column) of the Arc de triomphe in Paris.

Notes

Bibliography

 Hubert Granier, Histoire des marins français 1789-1815, Marines éditions, Namtes 1998.
 Michèle Battesti, La bataille d'Aboukir, 1798: Nelson contrarie la stratégie de Bonaparte, Economica, Paris 1998.

External links

Vice Admiral Francois Paul Brueys d'Aigalliers, Comte de Brueys

1753 births
1798 deaths
People from Uzès
French Navy admirals
Counts of Brueys
French Republican military leaders killed in the French Revolutionary Wars
Names inscribed under the Arc de Triomphe